St. George's Church, Cullercoats, North Tyneside, England, is a church built in the 19th-century French Gothic style.

Background

Looking over the North Sea, beacon-like, it was designed by the church architect John Loughborough Pearson and built in 1884 by the 6th Duke of Northumberland. The church, in particular its impressive spire of 180 feet, was used as a navigational aid by the fishermen of Cullercoats as well as by major shipping approaching Tynemouth in times gone by. Restoration work on this church has included the replacing of dangerously corroding stonework, roof repairs and the cleaning of some of the stained glass.  The church is a Grade I listed building.

Music

Choir
St George's choir has been described as "one of the best parish church choirs in the country". The choir sing for the Sung Eucharist every Sunday and at major weekday festivals.

Organ

The organ was built by Thomas Christopher Lewis in consultation with William Rea, the Newcastle City organist, and was dedicated a mere three months after the consecration of the church in February 1885. It stands in the south transept, directly under the tower, facing north, with a generous amount of free space around it. From this position, its commanding voice can be heard in all parts of the building without loss of impact, even with a full congregation. It is a substantial instrument, built in Lewis's grand style with Swell behind Great on the same level and Pedal on three unit chests behind and alongside the manual divisions. There is no facade casework, although the front pipes appear to have been laid out to receive one, the lower part is panelled in oak. The console is central in the case and is 'en fenêtre'. The action to manuals and drawstops is mechanical; the pedal action is pneumatic. A Discus blower feeds the main bellows which can still be raised by hand. A full restoration of the organ was carried out in 1987, by Harrison & Harrison of Durham. The organ is one of a small number in the country designed by Lewis which have not been significantly altered. The church has a regular recital series on bank holidays and in the summer months.

List of organists
 Mr. Smith 1884
 Mr C.H.S. Sherlock 1884 – 1891
 Charles Chambers 1893– unknown date
 Frederick Younger Robson 1897–1920
 May Baker 1920–1929
 Harry Davison 1930–1943
 Mr.G. S. Bell 1944–1947
 Colin Hayes 1947–1967
 Richard Capener 1967–1972
 David Jones 1972–1976
 John Harker 1976–1981
 Paul Ritchie 1981–2005 (David Noble deputised during Paul Ritchie's leave of absence 1989–1991)
 Shaun Turnbull 2005–2011
 Robert Gage 2011–2012
 Jonathan Clinch 2012–2013
 Robert Gage 2013–2014
 Peter Locke 2014–2015
 Craig Cartwright 2015
 Andrew Reid 2017–present

Bells
The church has four fixed bells which are struck by hammers operated by bell ropes from the ringing chamber. Two of the bells' hammers require repair (damaged due to wear and tear 2005). The smallest bell is most used as it has a second pulley in a more convenient location.

See also
 List of new ecclesiastical buildings by J. L. Pearson

Sources
 http://www.northumbria.info/Pages/stggecull.html
 http://www.stgeorgescullercoats.org.uk/

References

Churches in Tyne and Wear
Cullercoats, St George's Church
Churches completed in 1884
Cullercoats
Grade I listed churches in Tyne and Wear
19th-century Church of England church buildings